Nossa Senhora da Vitória was a 74-gun ship of the line of the Portuguese Navy, built at Lisbon, and launched on 19 August 1735.

Service history 

She was built at Ribeira das Naus, in Lisbon, and launched on 19 August 1735.

In 1736 she was the flagship of the Portuguese Campaign of the River Plate, during the Spanish–Portuguese War (1735–1737).

In 1739 she fought the Maratha ships of Sambhaji Angre on the Indian coast between Karwar and Honnavar.

Fate 
Vitória ran aground on 1746 off Mascarene Islands, while returning to Portugal.

References

Citations

Bibliography 

 

Ships of the line of the Portuguese Navy